Lawrence Dickson (May 31, 1920 – December 23, 1944) was an American pilot and a member of the famed group of the World War II-era Tuskegee Airmen. Dickson flew 68 mission in World War II before he was forced to eject from his aircraft over Austria in 1944. Dickson was declared missing in action. On July 27, 2018, Dickson's remains were identified by the Defense POW/MIA Accounting Agency.

Military service

Dickson graduated from Tuskegee in Alabama March 25, 1943. He was sent to Italy and assigned to the 100th Fighter Squadron, 332d Fighter Group. On December 23, 1944, Dickson was on his 68th mission piloting his aircraft as part of a mission to Praha, Czechoslovakia. On the return flight he ejected from his P-51 aircraft over Austria. The aircraft was flipped upside down and Dickson was declared missing in action.

Early in the mission Dickson reported engine trouble and notified his base in Ramitelli, Italy that he needed to return. Dickson broke from the mission and two wingmen escorted Dickson's sputtering plane. The trio gradually lost altitude, and Dickson looked for a spot to land or bail out. One of Dickson's wingmen (Martin) thought they were near the town of Tarvisio, in a mountainous area of northeastern Italy. Dickson's two wingmen followed but they were forced to take evasive action when Dickson's plane sputtered and dove: Dickson's engine trouble was catastrophic and he was forced to eject over Hohenthurn, Austria. One of Dickson's wingmen insisted that he saw Dickson eject but the December snowfall complicated the search for Dickson's white parachute. Dickson was declared missing in action. After the war it was revealed that German records had reported that a P-51 plane crashed at that site the day that Dickson disappeared.

During World War II the United States Army was segregated and black pilots had different rules. The black pilots of the Tuskegee Airmen could not qualify for R&R until they completed 70 missions. White pilots could take R&R after 50 missions. Dickson was on his 68th mission when he went missing over Austria.

Recovery and burial

On July 27, 2018, Dickson's remains were identified by the Defense POW/MIA Accounting Agency. A local researcher named Roland Domanig discovered the crash site and the human remains. The researcher said he visited the site in the 1950s as a child, but had not discovered the remains until 2002. An archeological crew was sent to the site in 2017 and they recovered bone fragments which matched Lawrence Dickson's daughter's DNA.

Also recovered at the crash site was a 14-karat ring that was inscribed: “P.D.,” with a heart with an arrow through it. The ring also was inscribed “L.E.D. 5-31-43.” P.D. were the initials of his wife Phyllis Dickson. L.E.D. Lawrence E Dickson and May 31, 1943, was his 23rd birthday. The Army also recovered a remnant of a harmonica and a small cross.

On March 22, 2019 Lawrence E. Dickson was laid to rest in a ceremony at Arlington National Cemetery. Four Air Force jets flew overhead while his daughter and grandchildren attended. His daughter Marla accepted the folded American flag from a kneeling Army General.

Awards
 Congressional Gold Medal 2007
 Distinguished Flying Cross
 Air Medal with four oak leaf clusters
 Purple Heart

Education
Tuskegee Institute 1943

Personal life
Lawrence Dickson was born to Agnes C. Dickson and he had two brothers. He was married to Phyllis. Dickson and his wife had a daughter. On July 14, 1942, at Harlem's Sydenham Hospital, Marla Dickson was born.

Dickson's mother did not live to attend the burial of her son: Phyllis died December 28, 2017, in Nevada at the age of 96.

See also
 Executive Order 9981
 Fly (2009 play about the 332d Fighter Group)
 List of African American Medal of Honor recipients
 List of solved missing person cases
 List of Tuskegee Airmen
 Military history of African Americans

References

Notes

External links
 Lawrence Dickson's Memorial Service
 Tuskegee Airmen at Tuskegee University
 Tuskegee Airmen Archives at the University of California, Riverside Libraries.
 Tuskegee Airmen, Inc.
 Tuskegee Airmen National Historic Site (U.S. National Park Service)
 Tuskegee Airmen National Museum

1920 births
1940s missing person cases
1944 deaths
Aerial disappearances of military personnel in action
Aviators killed in aviation accidents or incidents in Italy
Burials at Arlington National Cemetery
Congressional Gold Medal recipients
Formerly missing people
Military personnel from Tuskegee, Alabama
Missing in action of World War II
Missing person cases in Italy
People from New York (state)
People from the Bronx
Tuskegee Airmen
Tuskegee University alumni
United States Army Air Forces personnel killed in World War II
Victims of aviation accidents or incidents in 1944
World War II pilots